Acompsia is a genus of the twirler moth family (Gelechiidae). Though it has once been assigned to the proposed subfamily "Anacampsinae" (here included in Gelechiinae), it is generally placed in the Dichomeridinae. Some authors include Telephila here as a subgenus, while others prefer to keep it distinct as its relationships are fairly obscure.

Species
Species of Acompsia are:

Subgenus Acompsia Hübner, 1825
 Acompsia antirrhinella (Millière, 1866)
 Acompsia bidzilyai Huemer & Karsholt, 2002
 Acompsia caucasella Huemer & Karsholt, 2002
 Acompsia cinerella  (Clerck, 1759) 
 Acompsia delmastroella Huemer, 1998
 Acompsia dimorpha Petry, 1904
 Acompsia fibigeri Huemer & Karsholt, 2002
 Acompsia maculosella (Stainton, 1851)
 Acompsia minorella (Rebel, 1899)
 Acompsia muellerrutzi Wehrli, 1925
 Acompsia ponomarenkoae Huemer & Karsholt, 2002
 Acompsia pyrenaella Huemer & Karsholt, 2002
 Acompsia schepleri Huemer & Karsholt, 2002
 Acompsia schmidtiellus (Heyden, 1848) 
 Acompsia subpunctella Svensson, 1966
 Acompsia syriella Huemer & Karsholt, 2002
 Acompsia tripunctella (Denis & Schiffermüller, 1775)
Subgenus Telephila Meyrick, 1923
Unknown status
 Acompsia tenebrosella

Former species
 Acompsia angulifera (Walsingham, 1897) (now in Cathegesis)
 Acompsia jordanella (Rebel, 1911) (now in Oxypteryx)
 Acompsia psoricopterella (Walsingham, 1892) (now in Cathegesis)
 Acompsia vinitincta (Walsingham, 1910) (now in Cathegesis)

Synonyms
Invalid scientific names (junior synonyms and others) of Brachmia are:
 Acampsia (lapsus)
 Accompsia Bruand, 1850 (unjustified emendation)
 Brachicrossata (lapsus)
 Brachycrossata Heinemann, 1870

Footnotes

References

  (2008): Australian Faunal Directory – Telephila. Version of 2008-OCT-09. Retrieved 2010-APR-30.
  (2009): Acompsia (Acompsia) [sic]. Version 2.1, 2009-DEC-22. Retrieved 2010-APR-30.
  (2004): Butterflies and Moths of the World, Generic Names and their Type-species – Acompsia. Version of 2004-NOV-05. Retrieved 2010-APR-30.
  (2001): Markku Savela's Lepidoptera and some other life forms – Acompsia. Version of 2001-NOV-08. Retrieved 2010-APR-30.
 , 1998: A new endemic species of Acompsia from the Alps (Lepidoptera: Gelechiidae). Linzer biologische Beiträge 30 (2): 515-521. Full article: 

 
Dichomeridinae
Moth genera